Batinière is a settlement in the Oussouye Department of the Ziguinchor Region in south-west Senegal. In 2002 its population was recorded as 98 people in 14 households.

References

External links
PEPAM

Populated places in Ziguinchor Region